Cloughaneely is a district in the north-west of County Donegal in Ireland. This is a mainly coastal area with a population of over 4,000 centred on the towns of Falcarragh and Gortahork. It is a Gaeltacht area, meaning the Irish language is spoken as the primary language. Cloughaneely includes the secondary school Pobalscoil Chloich Cheannfhaola, with just under 500 students. Places of interest include Cnoc na Naomh, considered to be a mountain with religious significance. Cloughaneely, The Rosses and Gweedore, known locally as "the three parishes" with 16,000 Irish speakers, together form a social and cultural region different from the rest of the county, with Gweedore serving as the main centre for industry.

Irish language
There are 2 EDs Electoral Divisions in the area:
 Gort a Choirce  (1,599) (81%)
 Na Croisbhealai (2,168) (44%)

Etymology
The name Cloich Cheann Fhaola (also written Cloich Chionnaola, meaning "the Stone of Feeley's Head") comes from a story which tells of the killing of McFeeley. The story says that Balor of the Evil Eye beheaded him on a rock because he had stolen the Cow of Plenty that Balor had on the island of Toraigh (Tory Island)  from Balor's grasp and brought it back to the mainland.

Townlands in Cloughaneely
 Ballyness (Baile an Easa)
 Ballingat (Baile an Gheata)
 Ballyconnell (Baile Chonaill)
 Ballytemple (Baile an Teampaill)
 Caoldroim Íochtarach (Lower Keeldrum)
 Caoldrum lar (Middle Keeldrum)
 Caoldrum Thuas ( Upper Keeldrum)
 Derryconnor (Doire Chonaire)
 Falcarragh (An Fál Carrach)
 Gortahork (Gort an Choirce)
 Killult (Cill Ulta)
 Magheroarty (Machaire Rabhartaigh)
 Meenlaragh (Mín Lárach)
 An Sruthán Riach

Islands
 Inishbofin (Inis Bó Finne)
 Tory Island (Oileán Thoraigh)

Notable people
 Cathal Ó Searcaigh, poet
 Micí Mac Gabhann, memoirist
 Eithne Coyle, 1916 activist, spy, former president of Cumann na mBan, Mountjoy prison escapee
 Annemarie Ní Churreáin, Poet, Writer

See also
County Galway
Galway City Gaeltacht
Gaeltacht Cois Fharraige
Conamara Theas
Aran Islands
Joyce Country
County Donegal
Gaoth Dhobhair
Na Rosa
Gaeltacht an Láir
County Kerry
Gaeltacht Corca Dhuibhne
County Mayo
Gaeltacht Iorrais agus Acaill

External links
Gaeltacht Irish language use survey 2007

References

 
Gaeltacht places in County Donegal
Geography of County Donegal